Bishop Mule Days is an annual festival celebrating the mule, held in Bishop, California over a six-day period leading up to Memorial Day. More than 700 mules compete in 181 events and the largest non-motorized parade in the United States. It started as a small show in 1969 with a few hundred attendees and has grown to Bishop's largest event, attracting as many as 30,000 spectators. Among mule shows, Bishop Mule Days has been described as "The Granddaddy of Them All".

Bob Tallman has been the senior announcer of Bishop Mule Days for over 20 years. Also included are an arts and crafts show, and a country and western musical concert. The featured musical performer in 2010 was Lonestar and country star Jerrod Niemann performed in 2013.

2020 saw the COVID-19 pandemic as grounds for cancellation & deferral to 2021.

Parade 
The annual Bishop Mule Days parade takes place on the Saturday morning before Memorial Day. The parade route runs north on U.S. Route 395 through downtown Bishop. No motorized vehicles or floats are allowed; all entries must either be on foot, or use mules or horses. The 2010 parade had 110 units, including 18 mule pack strings from commercial pack stations and government agencies including the United States Forest Service, the National Park Service and the Mountain Warfare Training Center operated by the United States Marine Corps. Many historic mule-drawn and horse-drawn vehicles participate. Although most parade units are from California, units from Idaho, Nevada, Iowa, Arizona, Oregon and Utah participated in 2010.

Grand marshalls of the parade in past years have included Ronald Reagan and Norman Livermore.

On the event of the 50th anniversary in 2019, a twenty-mule team hauled a reproduction train of borax wagons. The two borax wagons and water wagon were built over a period of several years in the 2010s at Engels Coach Shop in Joliet, Montana, accurately copying the originals that are on display at Furnace Creek in Death Valley, California.

Competition 
Competitive events take place over a six-day period at the Tri-County Fairgrounds in Bishop. "A full slate of competitive events is featured, including events such as barrel racing, calf roping, steer stopping, cow penning, flat racing, and carriage driving. Activities also range from packing to dressage, and from team chariot racing to mule shoeing contests." There were nearly 220 classes in 2010.

The Pack Scramble 
The packing scramble is a competitive event unique to Bishop Mule Days. Mule pack strings enter the arena, and are unloaded and untethered. Rodeo cowboys then stampede the herd, firing blank gunshots. The event is described as a "wild and wooly spectacular" with "more than one hundred horses and mules running loose in the arena." "Teams of professional backcountry packers compete against each other for bragging rights. Each team must wrangle its own mules out of a herd in the arena, pack them correctly, and race around to the finish line as spectators whoop, cheer and jeer." The winning team is the one that is first to reassemble and reload its pack string, and lead it out of the arena.

References

External links 

 www.muledays.org — Bishop Mule Days official site

Annual events in California
Bishop, California
Festivals in California
Agricultural shows in the United States
Equestrian sports competitions in the United States
Tourist attractions in Inyo County, California
Equestrian festivals
Animal festival or ritual
Festivals established in 1969
1969 establishments in California